June Christy (born Shirley Luster; November 20, 1925June 21, 1990) was an American singer, known for her work in the cool jazz genre and for her silky smooth vocals. Her success as a singer began with The Stan Kenton Orchestra. She pursued a solo career from 1954 and is best known for her debut album Something Cool. After her death, she was hailed as "one of the finest and most neglected singers of her time."

Biography

Early life

Shirley Luster was born in Springfield, Illinois, United States. She moved with her parents Steve and Marie (née Crain) Luster to Decatur, Illinois, when she was three years old. She began to sing with the Decatur-based Bill Oetzel Orchestra at thirteen. While attending Decatur High School she appeared with Oetzel and his society band, the Ben Bradley Band, and Bill Madden's Band. After high school she moved to Chicago, changed her name to Sharon Leslie, and sang with a group led by Boyd Raeburn. Later she joined Benny Strong's band. In 1944, Strong's band moved to New York City at the same time Christy was quarantined in Chicago with scarlet fever.

Work with Stan Kenton's Orchestra

In 1945, after hearing that Anita O'Day had left Stan Kenton's Orchestra, she auditioned and was chosen for the role as a vocalist. During this time, she changed her name once again, becoming June Christy.

Her voice produced hits such as "Shoo Fly Pie and Apple Pan Dowdy", the million-selling "Tampico" in 1945, and "How High the Moon". "Tampico" was Kenton's biggest-selling record. When the Kenton orchestra temporarily disbanded in 1948, she sang in nightclubs for a short time, and reunited with the band two years later. Christy appeared as guest vocalist on the Kenton albums: Artistry in Rhythm (Capitol BD-39, 1946 [1947]), A Presentation of Progressive Jazz (Capitol CD-79, 1947 [1948]), Encores (Capitol CC-113, 1945–47 [1949]), Innovations in Modern Music (Capitol P-189, 1950), Stan Kenton Presents (Capitol L/P-248, 1950), Stan Kenton Classics (Capitol H/T-358, 1944–47 [1952]), and The Kenton Era (Capitol WDX-569, 1940–54, [1955]).

Beginning on September 28, 1959, Christy began a five-week road tour of 38 performances called Road Show. 
The all-star billing: Stan Kenton and his Orchestra, June Christy, and The Four Freshmen. Capitol recorded highlights on October 10 at Purdue University in Lafayette, Indiana, for a two-disc LP, reissued on CD in 1988.

Solo career

From 1947, she started to work on her own records, primarily with arranger and bandleader Pete Rugolo. In 1954, she released a 10" LP entitled Something Cool, recorded with Rugolo and his orchestra, a gathering of notable Los Angeles jazz musicians that included her husband, multi-instrumentalist Bob Cooper and alto saxophonist Bud Shank. Something Cool was re-released as a 12" LP in 1955 with additional selections, and then entirely rerecorded in stereo in 1960 with a somewhat different personnel. Christy would later say the album was "the only thing I've recorded that I'm not unhappy with". Something Cool was also important in launching the vocal cool movement of the 1950s, and it hit the Top 20 Charts, as did her third album, The Misty Miss Christy.

In the 1950s and 1960s, Christy appeared on a number of television programs, including the short-lived CBS show Adventures in Jazz (1949), Eddie Condon's Floor Show (1949), The Jackie Gleason Show (1953), The Tonight Show (1955), The Nat King Cole Show (1957), Stars of Jazz (1958), The Steve Allen Show (1959), The Lively Ones (1963), and The Joey Bishop Show (1967). She also appeared on the first sponsored jazz concert on television, The Timex All-Star Jazz Show I (December 30, 1957), which also featured Louis Armstrong, Carmen McRae, Duke Ellington, and Gene Krupa.

Christy played in Europe, South Africa, Australia, and Japan, but the extensive touring eventually began taking a toll on her marriage, and she pulled back from touring by the 1960s.

R.M. Cook and Brian Morton, writers of The Penguin Guide to Jazz Recordings, appreciated the singer's body of work: "Christy's wholesome but particularly sensuous voice is less an improviser's vehicle than an instrument for long, controlled lines and the shading of a fine vibrato. Her greatest momentsthe heartbreaking 'Something Cool' itself, 'Midnight Sun', 'I Should Care'are as close to creating definitive interpretations as any singer can come."

Personal life

Christy was married to Bob Cooper in 1947. In 1954, she gave birth to a daughter, Shay Christy Cooper (September 1, 1954February 21, 2014). She also had an older brother, Jack A. Luster (19202013).

Later years and death

Christy semi-retired from the music business in 1969, in part because of her battle with alcoholism.

In 1972, she sang at the Newport Jazz Festival in New York City, where she was reunited with the Kenton Orchestra. She also performed at a handful of jazz festivals during the late 1970s and 1980s, playing with a band of all-star West Coast jazz musicians led by Shorty Rogers, as well as taking part in a number of world tours.

Christy returned to the recording studio in 1977 to record her final solo LP, Impromptu. She recorded an interview in 1987 for a Paul Cacia produced album called "The Alumni Tribute to Stan Kenton" on the Happy Hour label. A number of other Kenton alumni (Shorty Rogers, Lee Konitz, Jack Sheldon, among them) interspersed their tunes with reminiscences of the man and the years on the road.

Christy toured one final time in 1988, again with Shorty Rogers. Her final performance was sharing the stage with Chet Baker.

Christy died at her home in Sherman Oaks, California, of kidney failure on June 21, 1990, at the age of 64. Her remains were cremated and scattered off the coast of Marina Del Rey.

Discography

Albums

Compilation CDs

Television appearances

References

External links

June Christy at last.fm

1925 births
1990 deaths
Musicians from Decatur, Illinois
Torch singers
American agnostics
Cool jazz singers
Cool jazz musicians
Deaths from kidney failure
American women jazz singers
Capitol Records artists
American jazz singers
Traditional pop music singers
20th-century American singers
20th-century American women singers
Jazz musicians from Illinois